General Crittenden may refer to:

George B. Crittenden (1812–1880), Confederate States Army major general
Thomas Leonidas Crittenden (1819–1893), Union Army major general
Thomas Turpin Crittenden (1825–1905), Union Army brigadier general